The 2020 Thindown Challenger Biella was a professional tennis tournament played on outdoor red clay courts. It was part of the 2020 ATP Challenger Tour. It took place in Biella, Italy between 28 September and 4 October 2020.

Singles main-draw entrants

Seeds

 Rankings are as of 21 September 2020.

Other entrants
The following players received wildcards into the singles main draw:
  Rémy Bertola
  Gabriele Felline
  Stefano Napolitano

The following player received entry into the singles main draw using a protected ranking:
  Blaž Kavčič

The following players received entry from the qualifying draw:
  Andrea Arnaboldi
  Alexandre Müller
  Andrea Pellegrino
  Tseng Chun-hsin

Champions

Singles

 Facundo Bagnis def.  Blaž Kavčič 6–7(4–7), 6–4, 0–0 ret.

Doubles

 Harri Heliövaara /  Szymon Walków def.  Lloyd Glasspool /  Alex Lawson 7–5, 6–3.

References

2020 ATP Challenger Tour
Tennis tournaments in Italy
2020 in Italian tennis
September 2020 sports events in Italy
October 2020 sports events in Italy